Hayat Kabasakal (née Enbiyaoğlu) is a Turkish management academic researching leadership, culture, gender, disaster management, and organizational behavior. She is a professor in the management department at Boğaziçi University.

Education 
Hayat Enbiyaoğlu completed a B.A. (1978) and a M.B.A. (1979) in the management department of the faculty of economics and administrative sciences at Boğaziçi University. In 1979, she was awarded a Fulbright scholarship for her doctoral studies. In 1984, Enbiyaoğlu earned a Ph.D. in business administration with a minor in psychology in the Carlson School of Management's department of strategic management and organization at the University of Minnesota. Her dissertation was titled Relationship among entrepreneur's previous experiences, business planning, business idea and company performance.

Career and research 
c joined Boğaziçi University as an assistant professor in the management department in 1984. She served as associate dean of the faculty of economics and administrative sciences from 1989 to 1991. Kabasakal was promoted to associate professor in 1989 and professor in 1995. 

Kabasakal researches leadership, culture, gender, disaster management, and organizational behavior.

References

External links 

 

Year of birth missing (living people)
Place of birth missing (living people)
Living people
Turkish women academics
Boğaziçi University alumni
Academic staff of Boğaziçi University
Carlson School of Management alumni
Management scientists
Leadership scholars